PGA Boulevard is a proposed Tri-Rail Coastal Link Green Line station in Palm Beach Gardens, Florida. The station is planned for construction at Dixie Highway (SR 811) and PGA Boulevard (SR 786).

References

External links
 Proposed site in Google Maps Street View

Tri-Rail stations in Palm Beach County, Florida
Proposed Tri-Rail stations
Palm Beach Gardens, Florida